The 2002 Armenian Cup was the 11th edition of the Armenian Cup, a football competition. In 2002, the tournament had 16 participants, out of which 2 were reserve teams.

Results

First round

The first legs were played on 30 and 31 March 2002. The second legs were played on 3 and 6 April 2002.

|}

Quarter-finals

The first legs were played on 19 and 20 April 2002. The second legs were played on 27 and 28 April 2002.

|}

Semi-finals

The first legs were played on 14 and 15 May 2002. The second legs were played on 20 and 21 May 2002.

|}

Final

See also
 2002 Armenian Premier League

External links
 2002 Armenian Cup at rsssf.com

Armenian Cup seasons
Armenia
Armenian Cup, 2002